Kiah Irene Stokes (born March 30, 1993) is an American-Turkish basketball player for the Las Vegas Aces of the Women's National Basketball Association (WNBA) and Fenerbahçe of the Turkish Super League (KBSL). She was chosen by the New York Liberty with the No.11 pick in the first round of the 2015 WNBA Draft at Mohegan Sun Arena. She played four years at the University of Connecticut where she was part of four consecutive Final Four teams and won three straight national championships, from 2013 to 2015. Prior to enrolling at UConn she played for Linn-Mar High School in Marion, Iowa.  She played on the USA Basketball U16 National Team, where she helped the team win the FIBA Americas U16 Championship Gold Medal. She is the daughter of former NBA player Greg Stokes.

Early life
Stokes is the daughter of Greg Stokes and Julie Saddler and has one brother, Darius. Her father was an all-American basketball player at the University of Iowa, played for the Philadelphia 76ers and won gold with the 1983 USA Pan American Games Team. When Stokes was only four years old, her father signed her up for a YMCA track team which was designed for five and six-year-olds. Despite being a year or two younger than everyone else she competed in the 60 yard dash and beat everyone by 20 yards. That's when he knew she might be a special type of athlete.

USA Basketball

2009 U16 Mexico City
Stokes was selected to be a member of the first ever U16 team for USA Basketball. The team competed in the First FIBA Americas U16 Championship For Women held in Mexico City, Mexico in August 2009. Stokes averaged 5.8 points and 3.3 rebounds per game. She helped the team to a 5–0 record and the gold medal at the competition. The win secured an automatic bid to the 2010 FIBA U17 World Championship.

College career

Freshman year
Stokes ended her freshman campaign averaging 4.5 points and 4.5 rebounds in her 13.4 minutes per game. Stokes was second on the team in blocks as she averaged 1.4 denials per game. She led the Huskies in blocks in 13 of 38 contests. Stokes shot 60 percent from the field and 65.3 percent from the free throw line. She was named to the All-BIG EAST Rookie Team along with teammate Kaleena Mosqueda-Lewis.

Sophomore year

As a sophomore in 2012–13, aided Connecticut to a 35–4 record and the 2013 NCAA National Championship. Stokes saw time in 32 games, averaging 2.8 points and 3.5 rebounds in 10.7 minutes per contest. She was third on the team with 39 blocks, and as an efficient 35-53 from the field (.660) and dished-out 21 assists against 20 turnovers. Stokes recorded double-digit minutes in 17 games.

Junior year
Stokes helped lead her team to an undefeated 40–0 season and the 2014 National Championship. Stokes started two of 39 games and averaged 4.5 points and was third on the squad at 7.1 rebounds in only 18.5 minutes per contest. She recorded four double-doubles, after posting just one in her first two years, with double-digit rebounds on eight occasions. She had seven or more rebounds 21 times during the season.

WNBA career

In two seasons, she has averaged 58.8% in field goals, 65.4% in free throws, and 6.3 points per game.

Kiah Stokes and the New York Liberty played in the 2016 WNBA playoffs.

Kiah Stokes' podcast Hangtime on the Underdog Sports Podcast Network is the first podcast ever hosted by a WNBA player.

Career statistics

College

WNBA

Regular season

|-
| style="text-align:left;"| 
| style="text-align:left;"| New York
| 34 || 6 || 25.4 || .547 || .000 || .688 || 6.4 || 0.8 || 0.7 || 2.0 || 1.1 || 5.8
|-
| style="text-align:left;"| 
| style="text-align:left;"| New York
| 27 || 0 || 24.1 || .641 || .000 || .627 || 7.4 || 0.7 || 0.7 || 1.4 || 1.1 || 6.9
|-
| style="text-align:left;"| 
| style="text-align:left;"| New York
| 34 || 12 || 19.6 || .531 || .000 || .796 || 6.3 || 0.9 || 0.4 || 1.1 || 1.2 || 4.8
|-
| style="text-align:left;"| 
| style="text-align:left;"| New York
| 30 || 4 || 14.2 || .545 || .000 || .533 || 4.5 || 0.4 || 0.4 || 0.6 || 0.7 || 3.1
|-
| style="text-align:left;"| 
| style="text-align:left;"| New York
| style="background:#D3D3D3"| 22° || style="background:#D3D3D3"| 22° || 27.3 || .372 || .235 || .571 || 6.7 || 1.2 || 0.5 || 1.2 || 1.3 || 5.7
|-
| style="text-align:left;"| 
| style="text-align:left;"| New York
| 9 || 0 || 15.0 || .545 || .500 || 1.000 || 4.2 || 0.6 || 0.4 || 0.7 || 0.7 || 1.7
|- class="sortbottom"
|-
| style="text-align:left;"| 
| style="text-align:left;"| Las Vegas
| 15 || 8 || 20.5 || .588 || .000 || .500 || 6.1 || 1.0 || 0.4 || 0.7 || 0.5 || 1.5
|-
|style="text-align:left;background:#afe6ba;"| 2022†
| style="text-align:left;"| Las Vegas
| 31 || 4 || 15.4 || .426 || .208 || .813 || 4.4 || 0.6 || 0.5 || 0.8 || 0.6 || 2.3
|-
| style="text-align:left;"| Career
| style="text-align:left;"| 7 years, 2 teams
| 202 || 56 || 20.4 || .515 || .228 || .693 || 5.8 || 0.8 || 0.5 || 1.1 || 0.9 || 4.3

Playoffs

|-
|style="text-align:left;"|2015
|style="text-align:left;"|New York
| 6 || 0 || 26.2 || .472 || .000 || .857 || 8.2 || 0.0 || 0.8 || 1.3 || 1.2 || 6.7
|-
|style="text-align:left;"|2016
|style="text-align:left;"|New York
| 1 || 0 || 10.0 || .333 || .000 || .500 || 2.0 || 0.0 || 1.0 || 0.0 || 1.0 || 3.0
|-
|style="text-align:left;"|2017
|style="text-align:left;"|New York
| 1 || 0 || 16.0 || .333 || .000 || .000 || 3.0 || 0.0 || 0.0 || 1.0 || 0.0 || 2.0
|-
|style="text-align:left;"|2021
|style="text-align:left;"|Las Vegas
| 5 || 2 || 14.2 || .400 || .000 || .500 || 2.6 || 1.0 || 0.4 || 0.6 || 0.4 || 1.0
|-
|style="text-align:left;background:#afe6ba;"| 2022†
| style="text-align:left;"| Las Vegas
| 10 || 10 || 25.9 || .486 || .200 || 1.000 || 7.2 || 0.4 || 0.6 || 0.8 || 0.8 || 3.7
|- 
|style="text-align:left;"| Career
|style="text-align:left;"| 5 years, 2 teams
| 23 || 12 || 22.3 || .463 || .200 || .769 || 6.0 || 0.4 || 0.6 || 0.9 || 0.8 || 3.8
|}

Awards and honors
Named to the 2009 Iowa Newspaper Association and Des Moines Register 4A All-State first team in 2009 and 2010.
Selected to the 2009 all-state tournament team.
Named to the Iowa Girls Coaches Association 2009 4A 
All-State first team.
Honored as an all-metro first team selection in 2009.
2010—Parade Magazine All-America fourth team honors.
2010—Gatorade State Player of the Year.
2010—ESPN Rise.com All-America second team.
Tabbed 2010 All-Mississippi Valley Conference first team in 2009 and 2010 and all-conference second team in 2008.
2015—First Team Senior CLASS Award All-American
2015—WNBA All-Rookie Team
2015—WNBA All-Defensive Second Team

References

External links
 Career information and statistics from WNBA.com and Basketball-Reference.com

1993 births
Living people
Turkish women's basketball players
American women's basketball players
Basketball players at the 2010 Summer Youth Olympics
Basketball players from Iowa
Centers (basketball)
Las Vegas Aces players
Linn-Mar High School alumni
New York Liberty draft picks
New York Liberty players
Parade High School All-Americans (girls' basketball)
Sportspeople from Cedar Rapids, Iowa
UConn Huskies women's basketball players
Fenerbahçe women's basketball players
Women's National Basketball Association players